Antón Villar Ponte

 (2 October 1881, Viveiro - 4 March 1936, A Coruña). He was one of the most important galicianists before the civil war. As a journalist he worked in A Nosa Terra, Nós, La Voz de Galicia, El Pueblo Gallego, and El Noroste.

Works
 Do caciquismo: A patria do labrego (1905)
 Nacionalismo gallego. Nuestra afirmación regional (1916)
 Os nosos valores (1920). Sociedade Económica de Santiago, A Nosa Terra, nº 120.
 Da superstición. Entre dous abismos (1920)
 Do cosmopolitismo, do universalismo e da mansedume galega (1921), "La Oliva", Vigo, A Nosa Terra nº 139.
 O sentimiento liberal na Galiza, RAG, 1934.
 Da emigración: Almas mortas: novela dialogada cómico tráxica en tres estancias (Editorial Céltiga, 1922)
 O Mariscal (1926; with Ramón Cabanillas).
 Teatro galego: tríptigo (Nós, 1928). (Do caciquismo: a patria do labrego; Da emigración: almas mortas; Da superstición: entre dous abismos).
 Os evanxeos da risa absoluta: anunciación do antiquixote. Folk-drama da sinxeleza campesina (Nós, 1934).
 Nouturnio de medo e morte, bárbara anécdota realista en dous tempos (sin literatura) que puido andar nos romances dos cegos (Nós, 1935)
 Escolma de artigos nazonalistas (1936)
 Pensamento e sementeira. Leiciós de patriotismo galego (1971), Salvador Lorenzana, Ediciones Galicia, Centro Gallego de Buenos Aires.
  (1991) Obra política de Ramón Villar Ponte. Edicións do Castro.
  &  (2003). O primeiro Antón Villar Ponte: achegamento ao período de formación do fundador das irmandades da fala (1881-1908). Caixa Galicia. .
  (2006). Antón Villar Ponte e a Academia Galega: contributos para a historia crítica dunha institución centenaria. Edicións do Cumio. .

References

External links 
 : Antón e Ramón Villar Ponte. Unha irmandade alén do sangue Cadernos Ramón Piñeiro, VII. 2004.

1881 births
1936 deaths
People from Viveiro
Autonomous Galician Republican Organization politicians
Partido Galeguista (1931) politicians
Members of the Congress of Deputies of the Second Spanish Republic
Writers from Galicia (Spain)
Galician-language writers